Henry Hillingford Parker (1858–1930) was an English landscape artist.


Life and work

Parker was born in London, England and was based there for most of his life. He specialised in picturesque pastoral landscapes in oils often featuring farming subjects - such as harvesting and haymaking - river and coastal landscapes, and traditional rural buildings. Much of his painting was done in the counties of southern England.

He studied art at St. Martins School of Art and later at one of the Royal Academy schools. Though a popular and successful artist, he never featured in any major national exhibitions during his lifetime (though he did exhibit in Canada and the USA),  and not much is known about his life. His works shows not only the influence of the impressionist school, but also owe something in technique and subject matter to his well-known contemporary Benjamin Williams Leader. He also worked for a time as an illustrator for the Illustrated London News.

Parker also painted under the names H.D. Hillier or H. D. Hillyer.

References

Wood, Christopher. Victorian Painters (Antique Collectors' Club Ltd, 1995).

External links
Henry H. Parker (Virtual exhibition at Rehsgalleries.com).
Henry H. Parker (artnet.com)
Henry H. Parker (onlinegalleries.com)

19th-century English painters
English male painters
20th-century English painters
Landscape artists
1930 deaths
1858 births
20th-century English male artists
19th-century English male artists